Enrique Vicente Hernández, (born 8 February 1945) also known as "Quique", (born 8 February or 8 December 1945) is a retired Spanish football defender.

Quique began his career with Real Valladolid. He played for Atlético Madrid between 1969 and 1974, winning the Spanish La Liga in 1970 and 1973 and the Copa del Rey in 1972.

References

1945 births
Sportspeople from Salamanca
Living people
Spanish footballers
Atlético Madrid footballers
Association football defenders